Shivchhatrapati College, is an undergraduate and postgraduate, coeducational college situated in Aurangabad, Maharashtra. It was established in the year 2001. The college is affiliated with Dr. Babasaheb Ambedkar Marathwada University.

Departments

Science
Physics
Mathematics
Chemistry
Electronics
Botany
Microbiology
Biotechnology
Zoology
Computer Science

Arts and Commerce
Marathi
English
Hindi
Pali
Sanskrit
History
Political Science
Psychology
Economics
Sociology
Dramatics
Home Science
Commerce

Accreditation
The college is  recognized by the University Grants Commission (UGC).

References

External links
http://www.shivchhatrapaticollege.org/

Dr. Babasaheb Ambedkar Marathwada University
Universities and colleges in Maharashtra
Educational institutions established in 2001
2001 establishments in Maharashtra